Denmark–Georgia relations refers to the current and historical relations between Denmark and Georgia. Denmark is represented in Georgia, through its embassy in Kyiv, Ukraine. Georgia has an embassy in Copenhagen. Denmark supports Georgia to become a member of the European Union and NATO. The current Georgian ambassador to Denmark is Gigi Gigiadze.

History
Diplomatic relations between Georgia and Denmark were established on 1 July 1992. In 2007, Denmark and Georgia signed a memorandum in the sphere of migration. On 22 April 2009, a military agreement was signed between Denmark and Georgia.

Prime Minister Anders Fogh Rasmussen condemned Russia's attack on the Georgian province of South Ossetia. Although Anders Fogh Rasmussen says that it's hard to "put himself into the background" of the conflict in the breakaway province. In February 2010, the Danish delegation to the Parliamentary Assembly of the Council of Europe, said that "the international community is interested Russias complying obligations in regard to Georgia, and therefore pressure on Russia must be increased."

Economic relations
In 2000, Georgian export to Denmark amounted 500,3 million dollars, while Danish export amounted 2,771 million dollars. In 2010, Georgian export amounted 5,140 million dollars and Danish export amounted 15,077 million dollars.

Development assistance
In the Neighbourhood Programme, Georgia has a high priority. A programme for good governance and human rights in Georgia and a programme for displaced people. $4 million was given to the programme. During the war in 2008, Danish Red Cross sent 1 million DKK to the victims. After the war in August 2008, Denmark increased aid to Georgia by 10 times. Denmark assisted 71 million DKK to Georgia for the private sector and to democracy and human rights.

State visits
Danish Prime Minister Anders Fogh Rasmussen paid a visit to Georgia on 27 November 2008, where he met Georgian President Mikheil Saakashvili, Prime Minister Grigol Mgaloblishvili and the Speaker of Parliament David Bakradze. Danish Foreign Minister Per Stig Møller met with Georgian opposition politicians in October 2009. Per Stig Møller also visited Sukhumi, Abkhazia where he met Abkhazian Foreign Minister Sergey Shamba. Georgian President Mikheil Saakashvili visited Denmark for the 2009 United Nations Climate Change Conference meeting in Copenhagen.

Resident diplomatic missions
 Denmark has an represented embassy in Kyiv. 
 Georgia has an embassy in Copenhagen.

See also  
 Foreign relations of Denmark
 Foreign relations of Georgia 
 Georgia–European Union relations

References

External links

 
Georgia
Bilateral relations of Georgia (country)